Lody Jean (born October 20, 1978) is a judge in Florida's 11th Judicial Circuit Court, Criminal Division. She was appointed to the court on April 17, 2020 by Governor Ron DeSantis. to replace John Schlesinger. Jean served on the Miami-Dade County Court, Civil Division, from April 2019, until her appointment to the circuit court. She was the first Haitian-American woman to be appointed on the Miami-Dade County Court and is the first Haitian-American to be appointed to the Eleventh Circuit Court.

Career 
While in law school, Jean interned with Legal Services of Greater Miami where she worked with staff on the Haitian Citizenship Project, a program for individuals of primarily Haitian descent who needed assistance applying for naturalization. Jean also interned at the Third District Court of Appeal, the Miami-Dade Public Defender's Office, and the Broward State Attorney's Office.

From 2012-2018, Jean served on the Florida Bar's Unlicensed Practice Law Committee, a voluntary committee of non-attorneys and attorneys who investigate the unlicensed practice of law in Miami-Dade County. Between 2004 and 2012, Jean served with the State Attorney of Miami-Dade County as an Assistant State Attorney and then as a Felony Division Chief. On November 16, 2018, Governor Rick Scott appointed Jean as Judge to the Miami-Dade County Court. Two years later, on April 17, 2020, Governor Ron DeSantis elevated Jean to serve on Florida's 11th Judicial Circuit Court in Miami-Dade County, becoming the first Haitian-American to serve in Florida's 11th Judicial Circuit Court. She is currently assigned to the Circuit's criminal division

References

1978 births
Living people
Circuit court judges in the United States
American people of Haitian descent
University of Miami alumni
St. Thomas University (Florida) alumni